Tommaso Labranca (18 February 1962 – 29 August 2016) was an Italian essayist, novelist, journalist, writer, and radio presenter.

Life and career
Born in Milan, Labranca started his career in the 1980s as a translator and an editor of fanzines. Interested in the Italian trash culture, which he considered as "the last major manifestation of Italian creativity", between 1992 and 1994 he directed the magazine Trashware, and he became first known for the books Andy Warhol era un coatto ("Andy Warhol was tacky", 1994) and Estasi del pecoreccio ("Extasy of the bad taste", 1995). In the 1990s he was part, together with Niccolò Ammaniti, Isabella Santacroce, Tiziano Scarpa and others, of a literary movement known as "i cannibali" ("the cannibals").

In 1997 he debuted as a television writer with the Rai 2 nostalgia show Anima mia, and starting from 2000 he collaborated with several radio stations including Radio Rai and Radio 24 as a writer and a presenter. In 2013 he founded an independent publishing house, 20090. His last work was the essay Vraghinaròda. Viaggio allucinante fra creatori, mediatori e fruitori dell'arte ("Vraghinaròda. Fantastic voyage between creators, users and mediators of art", 2016).

Labranca unexpectedly died of a heart attack at his home in Pantigliate, on the night of 29 August 2016. He was 54 years old.

References

1962 births
2016 deaths
Writers from Milan
20th-century Italian male writers
21st-century Italian male writers
20th-century Italian novelists
21st-century Italian novelists
20th-century Italian translators
Italian essayists
Male essayists
20th-century essayists
21st-century essayists
Italian television writers
Italian radio writers
Italian radio presenters
Italian journalists
Italian male journalists
Male television writers
Italian male non-fiction writers
Mass media people from Milan